Seed is a JavaScript interpreter and a library of the GNOME project to create standalone applications in JavaScript. It uses the JavaScript engine JavaScriptCore of the WebKit project. It is possible to easily create modules in C.

Seed is integrated in GNOME since the 2.28 version and is used by two games in the GNOME Games package. It is also used by the Web web browser for the design of its extensions. The module is also officially supported by the GTK+ project.

Hello world in Seed
This example uses the standard output to output the string "Hello, World".
#!/usr/bin/env seed

print("Hello, world!");

A program using GTK+ 
This code shows an empty window named "Example".
#!/usr/bin/env seed

Gtk = imports.gi.Gtk;
Gtk.init(Seed.argv);

var window = new Gtk.Window({title: "Example"});

window.signal.hide.connect(Gtk.main_quit);
window.show_all();

Gtk.main();

Modules
To use a module, just instantiate a class having for name imports. followed by the name of the module respecting the case sensitivity.

 The modules using GObject Introspection, who starts by imports.gi. :
 Gtk
 Gst
 GObject
 Gio
 Clutter
 GLib
 Gdk
 WebKit
  GdkPixbuf, GdkPixbuf
 Libxml
 Cairo
 DBus
 MPFR
 Os (system library)
 Canvas (using Cairo)
 multiprocessing
 readline
 ffi
 sqlite
 sandbox

List of the Seed versions
The names of the versions of Seed are albums of famous rock bands.

See also

 GNOME
 JavaScript
 Server-side JavaScript
 JavaScriptCore
 XULRunner

References

External links
 Seed on the GNOME wiki
 Seed documentation
 An auto-generated documentation of the Seed modules
 Official tutorial of Seed
 A short tutorial showing how to create a basic web browser using WebKitGTK+.
 Blog of Robert Carr

Programming tools
Free computer libraries
Linux programming tools
MacOS programming tools
JavaScript programming language family
GTK language bindings